Georges Cochon (1879-1959) was a tapestry maker, an anarchist and the secretary of the Federation of Tenants.

Biography
He was born on March 26, 1879 in Chartres, France. In 1912 in Paris he developed a strategy to help tenants with overdue payments keep their belongings. He died on April 25, 1959.

External links
Georges Cochon at Libcom

References

1879 births
Politicians  from Chartres
1959 deaths
French anarchists